The Fab Tree Hab is a hypothetical ecological home design developed at MIT by Mitchell Joachim, Javier Arbona and Lara Greden. With the idea of easing the burden humanity places on the environment with conventional housing by growing "living, breathing" tree homes.

It would be built by allowing native trees  to grow over a computer-designed (CNC) removable plywood scaffold. Once the plants are interconnected and stable, the plywood would be removed and reused. MIT is experimenting with trees that grow quickly and develop an interwoven root structure that's soft enough to "train" over the scaffold, but then hardens into a more durable structure. The inside walls would be conventional clay and plaster.

An old methodology new to buildings is introduced in this design: pleaching. Pleaching is a method of weaving together tree branches to form living archways, lattices, or screens. The technique is also named "aeroponic culture". The load-bearing part of the structure uses trees that self-graft or inosculate such as live oak, elm and dogwood. The lattice frame for the walls and roof are created with the branches of the trees. Vines create a dense protective layer woven along the exterior, interspersed with soil pockets and growing plants.

This building could be very sustainable as it can use bio-waste for manure for the trees. Which can use the grey water from the home for the trees and garden. There are plans to be able to use rainwater. These building would improve the quality of life by giving back to nature instead of just exploiting it. Throughout the whole life cycle of the home it remains part of the ecology, feeding different organism at different times of its life. The expected life span is greater than standard structures of brick and concrete.  The whole community and the individual would befit from this life style.

The Fab Tree Hab is an experiment that would develop over time.  Extra operating costs required over the life-time of the home include pest management with organic pesticides and maintenance of the living machine's water treatment system.  Technical demonstration and innovation is still needed for certain components, primarily the bioplastic windows that accept growth of the structure and the management of flows across the wall section to assure that the interior remains dry and animal-free.  All in all, the elapsed time to reach livability is greater than the traditional sense, but so should be the health and longevity of the home and family.  Above all, building this home could be achieved at a minimal price. Depending on the surrounding climate the house is to be grown in, the team expect it will take a minimum of five years to complete its structure. Realization of these homes will begin as an experiment, and it is envisioned that thereafter, the concept of renewal will take on a new architectural form, one of inter-dependency between nature and people.

As of May 2007 Mitchell Joachim stated that there is a "50 per cent" organic project in California, combining natural elements and traditional construction.

Trees
Main trees suggested to be used are elms, dogwood and oaks. The teams hopes the homes can be grown using mainly native trees.

See also

References

Further reading
James Nestor, "Branching Out," Dwell, Vol. 7 No. 3, pp. 96–98, Feb. 2007.
Gregory Mone, "Grow your second home," Popular Science, pp. 38–9, Nov. 2006.
Carolyn Johnson, "MIT plants seeds of a new kind of house", The Boston Globe, p. C1, Sept. 25th, 2006.
Tracy Staedter, “House and Garden - Architects design a living home," Technology Review, pp. m2-m9, VOL. 109/ NO.3, July/ August, 2006.
Gail Hennessey, "Living in the Trees, " Scholastic News, Mar. 9, 2006.
Linda Stern, "Beware of Squirrels," Newsweek, p. E2, May 28, 2007.
Mitchell Joachim, Javier Arbona, and Lara Greden. "Fab Tree Hab," 306090 08: Autonomous Urbanism, Monson & Duval, ed., Princeton Architectural Press, 2005.
Richard Reames, Arborsculpture- Solutions for a Small Planet, Arborsmith Studios, 2005 .
David J. Brown, Ed., The HOME House Project: The Future of Affordable Housing, MIT Press, 2004.
Mitchell Joachim, J. Arbona, L. Greden, "Fab Tree Hab," Thresholds Journal #26 DENATURED, MIT, 2003.

External links
 
 Newsweek: Terreform - Building Houses Out of Living Trees
 MIT Architecture: Computation WORKS
 Arborsmith Studios- Shaped trees, history, books, tools 
 5 minute Video talk Mitchell gave at TED

Sustainable technologies
Architectural theory
Landscape

pt:Eco-design
ta:தாங்குதிறன் வடிவமைப்பு
zh:永續設計